Mount Davis, or Mt. Davis, is a section of 20,000 capacity seating at the Oakland Coliseum in Oakland, California, United States. It was built in 1995 at the behest of Oakland City Council with the intent of bringing the Los Angeles Raiders American football team back to Oakland and is named after former Oakland Raiders owner Al Davis. Since 2006, the top-tier seating of Mount Davis has been covered by tarpaulin during all Oakland Athletics baseball games, and the Oakland Raiders followed suit in 2013.

History 
In 1982, the Oakland Raiders left Oakland because of the city's refusal to upgrade the Oakland-Alameda County Coliseum, leaving the Oakland Athletics baseball team as the sole tenants. Previously, the team had to contend with two setups in the same stadium within a season before the move to Los Angeles and in 1995; in baseball season, they played in an alternate home plate-to-centerfield configuration when the two teams were in season, while then maintaining a large section of portable bleachers to provide northeast sideline seating after the A's season ended, meaning season ticket holders had to contend with two different seating assignments, even in the main seating bowl. The former seating arrangement could consist of half the Raiders' home games if the A's advanced to the World Series, well into October.

In 1995, the city made an agreement with Raiders owner Al Davis that they would increase the capacity of the Coliseum in exchange for him bringing the Raiders back to Oakland. The result was a structure that became known as Mount Davis after Davis. There was criticism when Mount Davis was built as it obstructed views of the Oakland Hills. It was completed in 1996 but was criticized for being too steep and taking spectators too far away from the field of play. It had been noted to negatively affect baseball as while it provided a shield against the sun for outfielders chasing fly balls, it was an enclosed concrete stadium and had lost capacity for the Athletics.

Mount Davis cost approximately $500 million to build, with the cost shared by Alameda County and the city of Oakland. From then it cost the county and the city a shared $20 million a year in debt repayments, which had the side effect of the city having to lay off police officers. In 2015, Alameda County paid off the remaining $100 million of debt from its own surplus reserves, arranging for the city to continue annual payments to the county on its share of the $100 million.

Tarpaulin 

Owing to low attendance, in 2006 the Oakland Athletics installed a layer of tarpaulin (tarp) covering all top-tier seating areas of the Coliseum, including the top level of Mount Davis. As the Athletics could not sell advertising space on the tarp due to city regulations, various Athletics-related messages were printed instead on the tarp; the Mount Davis sections of tarp display the team's logo and retired numbers. The covered seats numbered 20,878, representing approximately 37% of seating capacity in the Coliseum.

Though the tarp can be removed, the Athletics management previously refused to do so unless the team made the World Series, as they claimed it made the stadium more "intimate". This policy was maintained to the chagrin of many fans during the 2012 American League Division Series where all other seats were sold out with demand for more tickets but the tarp was not removed. For the 2013 American League Division Series, the tarp was removed from the rest of the third deck, but not Mount Davis. However, in 2017, Athletics president Dave Kaval announced that some sections of tarp – though not those on Mount Davis – would be removed for at least the remainder of the 2017 season. Done in response to the long-standing fan complaints, this move added back 12,103 seats to the Coliseum during Athletics games, leaving the 8,775 seats on Mount Davis still covered.

In 2013, the Oakland Raiders also started covering Mount Davis with tarp owing to the National Football League television blackout policies which obligate teams to black out the game if they cannot sell more than 85% stadium capacity. Over the previous few years, the Raiders had been forced to black out more home games than were televised. This had the effect of making the Oakland-Alameda County Coliseum the smallest stadium in the National Football League. Under NFL rules, Mount Davis had to remain tarped all season long, no matter if they made the NFL playoffs or not. The Raiders kept Mount Davis tarped from 2013 until the team moved to Las Vegas in 2020, though after 2015, the NFL suspended its blackout policies.

On July 21, 2018, the tarp on Mount Davis was removed by the A's for an interleague matchup against the Bay Bridge rival San Francisco Giants in a successful attempt to break a Coliseum attendance record. Tickets were sold for $10 apiece. In 2019, the A's again opened Mount Davis for fans during the Bay Bridge Series against the Giants and for the 2019 American League Wild Card Game against the Tampa Bay Rays. With the tarps off for the wild card game, they set a record for the highest attendance at a Wild Card game at 54,005.

References 

1996 establishments in California
Oakland Athletics
Oakland Raiders